Founded in 1985, the Australian and New Zealand Academy of Management (ANZAM) is a professional body representing management educators, practitioners, and researchers in Australia and New Zealand (ANZ).

Membership 
Membership is open to individuals from ANZ and overseas, and institutions (most ANZ universities are members). Individual membership is recognized in five levels, with recognized Australian post-nominal letters:
 ANZAM Life Fellow (ANZAM-L)
 ANZAM Fellow (ANZAM-F)
 ANZAM Professional Member (ANZAM-M)
 ANZAM Retired Member (ANZAM-R)
 ANZAM Associate Member ANZAM-A)

Journal 
Journal of Management and Organization (JMO), which is listed in the Social Sciences Citation Index.

Annual conference 
ANZAM Conducts an annual conference, normally in major cities in either Australia or New Zealand.

International affiliation 
ANZAM is affiliated with the (US-Based) Academy of Management.

Presidents
 Greg Bamber, Professor, Department of Management, Monash University

References

External links 
Official Website

Professional associations based in Australia
Professional associations based in Oceania